Sergey Alexeyevich Fedosienko (born 31 July 1982) is a Russian powerlifting competitor. Fedosienko has won 15 gold medals at the world equipped championships and 7 gold medals at the world classic (raw) championships in the IPF. Fedosienko has also won two World Games gold medals in 2013 and 2017. 

Fedosienko is 1.46 metres, or 4'8", tall.

In 2005, Fedosienko failed a doping test and received a 2-year ban. He was stripped of his gold medal at the 2005 European Powerlifting Championships.

In 2022, Russia was banned from competing in the European and International Powerlifting Federations due to declaring war on Ukraine. Due to Fedosienko residing in Russia, this would end his 12-year streak as a world champion and be stripped from competing at the 2022 World Games.

References

1982 births
Russian powerlifters
Living people
World Games gold medalists
Competitors at the 2013 World Games
Competitors at the 2017 World Games
Sportspeople from Novosibirsk Oblast
20th-century Russian people
21st-century Russian people